"Emotion" is a song written by Barry and Robin Gibb. It was first recorded by Australian singer Samantha Sang, whose version reached number three on the Billboard Hot 100 chart in 1978. The Bee Gees recorded their own version of the song in 1994 as part of an album called Love Songs, which was never released, but it was eventually included on their 2001 collection titled Their Greatest Hits: The Record. In 2001, "Emotion" was covered by the American R&B girl group Destiny's Child. Their version of the song was an international hit, reaching the top ten on the US Hot 100 chart and peaking in the top five on the UK Singles Chart. English singer Emma Bunton also covered the song on her 2019 album My Happy Place.

Original version

Background
Originally, "Emotion" was recorded by Samantha Sang for the Private Stock label. The song was Sang's only hit single, reaching number 3 on the Billboard Hot 100. Billboard ranked her version as the No. 14 song for 1978. There is a promotional video made for this song.

When Sang arrived in Miami, instead of recording "Don't Throw It All Away", Barry Gibb offered her a new song called "Emotion". On this track, Sang sticks to a breathy, Barry-like sound. Gibb himself provided harmony and background vocals in his signature falsetto. The B-side was "When Love Is Gone", a Francis Lai composition. It was recorded around April 1977 in Criteria Studios in Miami, Florida around the same time that Barry contributed writing and producing "Save Me, Save Me" for the band Network. Blue Weaver identified the musicians as shown from memory. On the session, Joey Murcia plays guitar, George Bitzer on keyboards, Harold Cowart on bass and Ron "Tubby" Zeigler on drums. It was originally intended for use in the 1977 film Saturday Night Fever, but ended up being featured in the film The Stud (1978) starring Joan Collins. Also in 1978, "Emotion" was used as the B-side of Johnny Mathis and Deniece Williams's single "Too Much, Too Little, Too Late", which reached number one in the US.

Personnel
Samantha Sang – vocals
Barry Gibb – harmony and background vocals
George Terry – guitar
Joey Murcia – guitar
George Bitzer – keyboards, Fender Rhodes Electric Piano
Harold Cowart – bass
Ron Ziegler – drums
Karl Richardson – engineering

Track listings and format
 "Emotion" – 3:43
 "When Love Is Gone" – 3:46

Chart performance

Weekly charts

Year-end charts

Certifications and sales

Destiny's Child version

Recording and production
In 2001, "Emotion" was recorded by American group Destiny's Child for their third studio album Survivor (2001). Produced and arranged by Mark J. Feist, it features a slower tempo than the original, although a more uptempo remix produced by Neptunes was also produced and included on the group's remix album This Is The Remix (2002). Feist had previously produced the song for Filipino singer Regine Velasquez for her album Drawn in 1998 and used exactly the same backing track for Destiny's Child.

Release and promotion
"Emotion" was released as the third single from Survivor on 4 September 2001, by Columbia Records. The song was heavily played on radio stations during the aftermath of the 11 September 2001 attacks and eventually became a tribute song to the family of the victims. The group also paid tribute to R&B singer Aaliyah, who died in an August 2001 plane crash, at the Soul Train Lady of Soul Awards by performing the song. Several international formats of "Emotion" contain "8 Days of Christmas" as a B-side, which previously appeared on the US maxi CD single of "Independent Women Part I" (2000).

Commercial performance
"Emotion" continued Destiny's Child's streak of top-ten hits in the United States, peaking at number ten on the Billboard Hot 100 on 1 December 2001 thought it became their first to miss the top 3. It was also a hit in the United Kingdom, where it peaked at number three on the UK Singles Chart and sold over 145,000 copies. Internationally, it reached the top ten in several major music markets, including New Zealand, Ireland, and the Netherlands.

Music video
The song's accompanying music video, directed by Francis Lawrence, featured a triple split-screen effect. Rowland appears on the left, Knowles in the center, and Williams on the right. Rowland is seen saying goodbye to her boyfriend before he leaves in a taxi. Knowles catches her boyfriend with another woman and runs around the house in tears. Williams is with her grandmother, who has died in her bed. At the end of the video Williams calls the other group members to her home. The three girls meet there and comfort each other. The screen then returns to normal.

The music clip is featured as an enhanced video on the European editions of the CD single and on the 2004 Walmart-exclusive DVD titled Fan Pack.

Track listings

UK CD1
 "Emotion" (album version) – 3:56
 "8 Days of Christmas" (album version) – 3:29
 "Emotion" (Maurice's Nu Soul mix) – 7:55
 "Emotion" (video)

UK CD2
 "Emotion" (The Neptunes main mix) – 4:15
 "Bootylicious" (Rockwilder remix) – 4:13
 "Emotion" (Jameson full vocal remix) – 6:19
 "Bootylicious" (Rockwilder remix video version)

UK cassette single
 "Emotion" (album version) – 3:56
 "Emotion" (Calderone AM mix) – 10:13

European CD1
 "Emotion" (album version) – 3:56
 "8 Days of Christmas" – 3:29

European CD2
 "Emotion" (album version) – 3:56
 "8 Days of Christmas" – 3:29
 "Emotion" (Calderone dub mix) – 6:55
 "Emotion" (video) – 3:56

Australian and New Zealand CD single
 "Emotion" (Maurice's Nu Soul mix edit) – 4:00
 "8 Days of Christmas" (album version) – 3:29
 "Emotion" (The Neptunes remix) – 4:15
 "Emotion" (Erroll McCalla remix) – 3:58
 "Emotion" (Calderone AM mix) – 10:13

Japanese CD single
 "Emotion" (album version)
 "Emotion" (Maurice's Nu Soul mix)
 "Emotion" (instrumental)
 "Emotion" (a cappella)

Charts

Weekly charts

Year-end charts

Certifications

Release history

Emma Bunton version
Emma Bunton covered the song on her 2019 album My Happy Place.

References

External links
 DestinysChild.com — official site
 

1977 singles
1978 singles
2001 singles
Destiny's Child songs
Samantha Sang songs
Bee Gees songs
Music videos directed by Francis Lawrence
Songs written by Barry Gibb
Songs written by Robin Gibb
Song recordings produced by Barry Gibb
Pop ballads
1970s ballads
1977 songs
Private Stock Records singles
Columbia Records singles
Song recordings produced by Albhy Galuten
Cashbox number-one singles
RPM Top Singles number-one singles
Number-one singles in New Zealand
Song recordings produced by Beyoncé